Tomoya Asano (浅野 智也, born 24 December 1978) is a Japanese game producer working for Square Enix. After graduating from Keio University Asano first joined Enix in 2001, before gaining a more prominent role within the company after its merger. He started off working on several titles before producing a few titles in the Final Fantasy series. After producing Final Fantasy: The 4 Heroes of Light, Asano and several members on his team went on to create a spiritual successor in Bravely Default. 

In 2017 Asano was made head of his own business division in Square Enix, called Business Division 11 and focusing work on the Bravely series and new titles such as Octopath Traveler. The business division was later consolidated in 2019, following a restructure in the divisions of the company, with Business Division 6, 7 and 11 merging to create Creative Business Unit II. However, within Creative Business Unit II Asano and his team are known as Team Asano as they continue working on games similar to their previous creations.

Works

References 

Japanese video game designers
Japanese video game producers
Final Fantasy designers
1978 births
Living people
Square Enix people